Mikhail Nikolayevich Elgin (born 14 October 1981) is a Russian professional tennis player.

Elgin became famous when he advanced to the quarter–finals in singles at the 2008 St. Petersburg Open, where he lost to Victor Hănescu from Romania 1–6, 4–6.

Career finals

ATP career finals

Doubles: 4 (1 title, 3 runners-up)

Other Finals

Futures and Challenger finals

Singles: 27 (17 titles, 10 runners-up)

Doubles: 95 (62 titles, 33 runners-up)

Career statistics

Doubles performance timeline

External links
 
 

1981 births
Living people
Sportspeople from Saint Petersburg
Russian male tennis players